76 Place at Market East is a proposed indoor arena in Center City Philadelphia. It will be the future home of the Philadelphia 76ers of the National Basketball Association (NBA), moving from the Wells Fargo Center, which is currently shared as their home arena with the Philadelphia Flyers.

The proposed arena will be located in Center City on the site of Fashion District Philadelphia. It will be privately funded at a cost of $1.3 billion. 76Devcorp is in charge of the development process and is being chaired by real estate developer, David J. Adelman.

76 Place at Market East will be located one block from a SEPTA Market–Frankford Line subway stop and Jefferson Station, a commuter train station.

History
The 76ers current home, the Wells Fargo Center opened in 1996. The Wells Fargo Center is part of the South Philadelphia Sports Complex, which is also home to Lincoln Financial Field and Citizens Bank Park. The South Philadelphia Sports Complex has been critiqued as lacking access to public transportation - it is only served by the Broad Street Line - and there are little to no nearby restaurants and bars. However, plans to build a downtown stadium had been unsuccessful in the past. The Philadelphia Phillies attempted to build a downtown stadium in Chinatown, Philadelphia, but neighbors protested the decision. Eight years later, residents once again protested and blocked the proposed construction of Foxwoods Casino Philadelphia. 

The Wells Fargo Center underwent extensive renovations in 2019 and 2020 including the installation of a new "kinetic" 4K-resolution scoreboard and expanded luxury suites.

76ers search for a new arena
The 76ers had long been rumored to be searching for a new home arena. The Wells Fargo Center is owned by Comcast Spectacor, so the 76ers do not make money off secondary events at the stadium, such as concerts, or naming rights agreements. In 2013, there were rumors that team owner Josh Harris, who also owned the Prudential Center, would be moving the team to Trenton, New Jersey. Talk of a potential new stadium increased in 2015 when team ownership began referring to The Wells Fargo Center as just The Center. In 2020, the team proposed a plan, that would be partially publicly-funded, to build a new arena at Penn's Landing, but they were outbid for the site by the Durst Organization.

Fashion District Philadelphia
Fashion District Philadelphia is an indoor shopping mall located along Market Street. Opened in 2019, it is anchored by Burlington, Primark, AMC Theatres, and Round One Entertainment. The Pennsylvania Real Estate Investment Trust, which co-owned Fashion District Philadelphia declared bankruptcy in 2020, and Macerich, the other co-owner took substantial control over the mall's operations. The mall lost a number of tenants due to shutdowns during the COVID-19 pandemic. Macerich endorsed the plan to convert part of Fashion District Philadelphia into an arena and referred to it as a "natural evolution" of the property.

The Fashion District Philadelphia was preceded by another indoor mall, Gallery at Market East, which opened in 1977, but by the mid-2000s had significantly declined as a result of losing a significant number of anchors, which were replaced by lower end stores. It closed in 2015.

Construction
The 76ers hired Gensler, a global design and architecture firm, based in San Francisco, to design the stadium, and AECOM, an engineering firm, to build the stadium. The 76ers have promised to hire women, African-Americans and other minority groups to serve as contractors in the construction.

Ryan Boyer, the head of the Philadelphia Building and Construction Trades Council, praised the planned stadium as having the opportunity to "galvanize the construction industry in Philadelphia." A number of unions in Philadelphia reached out to Philadelphia high schoolers to provide internship opportunities during the stadium's construction. Consultants working on the stadium expect as many as 9,000 professionals, trades members and managers to work on the project.

The 76ers do not plan to speed up the construction process in order to leave their current lease with The Wells Fargo Center sooner.

The stadium will replace one-third of Fashion District Philadelphia including the AMC Dine-In movie theater and Round 1 Bowling and Amusement. Groundbreaking on the stadium is not expected for several years.

On August 2, 2022, The Philadelphia Inquirer reported that the 76ers planned to buy the site of the Philadelphia Greyhound Terminal on Filbert Street that is next to Fashion District Philadelphia. The team plans to use the site of the bus station to attract new businesses.

Timeline of construction
 2022-2024: Approval of construction permits from city and state
 2024-2026: Stadium engineers and developers design stadium
 2026-2027: Portions of Fashion District Philadelphia demolished
 2028-2031: Construction of 76 Place at Market East

Funding
The developers claim the project will be privately funded unlike Philadelphia's Lincoln Financial Field and Citizens Bank Park. However, a previous 30-year agreement that the property taxes for the site will be reduced remains in place through 2035. Additionally, leaders within 76Devcorp have said they are open to accepting state or federal funding for this project.

Design
76 Place at Market East is expected to seat 18,500 people, which is smaller than the 20,000 person capacity at the Wells Fargo Center. The site of the stadium was chosen because of its close location to a number of public transit options including trains and subways.

Controversy
76 Place at Market East will be located one block from Chinatown. Asian Americans United, founded in 1985 so that people of Asian ancestry in Philadelphia can exercise leadership to build their communities and unite to challenge oppression, announced their opposition to the arena shortly after the developers released their plans. Steven Zhu, the President of the Chinese Restaurant Association, said in a statement "We know these big sports arenas do not contribute to the neighborhoods that they are in; they serve only their own needs and their own profits." Zhu also used Capital One Arena as a cautionary tale given that the Chinese population and number of Chinese restaurants have declined significantly in Chinatown, Washington, D.C. since the stadium's construction.

Some local residents criticized the plan as it would demolish a block of the Fashion District, which was one of the few local spots to hangout. Others believed that investors should have put more money into poorer Philadelphia neighborhoods rather than Center City. Then-Philadelphia City Councilman David Oh speculated that the plan to build the arena may be smoke and mirrors and an attempt for the 76ers to gain concessions from the Wells Fargo Center's owner, Comcast Spectacor. 

76Devcorp has vowed to reach a "public benefits agreement" with neighbors and have met with local organizations including the Philadelphia Chinatown Development Corp.  After months of private closed-door meetings, 76Devcorp failed to win over community members at the first public meeting organized by over 20 local community organizations in December 2022. At this public meeting, community members voiced their concerns around traffic, community safety, and parking. The community criticized 76Devcorp when Hercules Grigos, a lawyer working with the 76ers’ development team, sent Philadelphia City Council a revised version of a bill to refinance a downtown parking garage that included an unrelated provision that would have made it easier to close Filbert Street between 10th and 11th Streets and fast-track the controversial proposal.

In January 2023, more than 40 Chinatown community groups, nonprofits, and business organizations announced the "Chinatown Coalition to Oppose the Arena", this coalition will have assistance from the Asian American Legal Defense and Education Fund.

Tenants
The arena is designed to be the future home of the Philadelphia 76ers by 2031. David J. Adelman said that the venue also plans to host concerts, events and youth sporting events.

Potential tenants

Flyers 
In an interview with ESPN on the day of announcement, Sixers CEO Tad Brown said that the 76ers would welcome the Flyers joining them in the new venture. The Flyers currently play at the Wells Fargo Center as well. Comcast Spectacor owns both the Flyers and the Wells Fargo Center. Comcast Spectacor and Harris Blitzer Sports & Entertainment are currently in discussions about the 76ers moving.

WNBA expansion team 
A June 2021 article in Billy Penn stated that one of the potential draws of a WNBA team to Philadelphia would be  a new arena that serves as a home to the 76ers. The Athletic reported in June 2022 that Philadelphia was one of six cities on a shortlist for an expansion team for the WNBA by the year 2024. A group lead by Pennsylvania resident Wanda Sykes and Philadelphia native Dawn Staley expressed interested in bringing an expansion team to Philadelphia.

References

Basketball venues in Pennsylvania
Philadelphia 76ers
National Basketball Association venues
Proposed indoor arenas in the United States
Sports venues in Philadelphia